Philip John Caley (born 18 October 1962) is a former English cricketer.  Caley was a right-handed batsman who bowled right-arm off break.  He was born at Harwich, Essex.

Caley made his debut for Suffolk in the 1982 Minor Counties Championship against Cambridgeshire.  Caley played Minor counties cricket for Suffolk from 1981 to 2009, which included 219 Minor Counties Championship appearances (between 1981 and 2006, he missed just two fixtures) and 54 MCCA Knockout Trophy matches.  He made his List A debut against Derbyshire in the 1983 NatWest Trophy.  He made 22 further List A appearances, the last of which came against Glamorgan in the 2005 Cheltenham & Gloucester Trophy.  In his 22 List A matches, he scored 514 runs at an average of 32.12, with a high score of 88 not out.  His score, one of two half centuries he made in List A cricket, came against Somerset in the 1996 NatWest Trophy.  He retired at the end of the 2009 season, ending his career as the county's leading run scorer with 9,268 runs, 49 runs ahead of Simon Clements.  He is currently the Cricket Chairman of the Minor Counties Cricket Association.

References

External links
Philip Caley at ESPNcricinfo
Philip Caley at CricketArchive

1962 births
Living people
People from Harwich
English cricketers
Suffolk cricketers
English cricket administrators